Joshua C. Legree was a political organizer and politician in Georgia during the Reconstruction era. He was the first mayor of Burroughs, Georgia.

See also
African-American officeholders during and following the Reconstruction era

References

Date of birth missing
African-American politicians during the Reconstruction Era
Date of death missing